Joseph Ridgeway Taylor Coates (died September 21, 1921) was an American lawyer and politician from Pennsylvania who served as mayor of Chester, Pennsylvania from 1887 to 1893. He was an officer in the Pennsylvania Reserves infantry division of the Union Army in the American Civil War and served in some of the key battles of the war.

Military service
In 1861 Coates was mustered in as a 1st lieutenant to the 1st Pennsylvania Reserve Regiment, also known as the 30th Pennsylvania Volunteer Infantry, Company C.  Recruited out of Chester, Company C was first known as the "Keystone Guards" and then known for a time as the "Slifer Phalanx".

Coates and Company C served at the Battle of Mechanicsville, the Battle of New Market, Second Battle of Bull Run, the Battle of Antietam, the Battle of Fredericksburg, the Battle of Gettysburg, the Battle of Bristoe Station and the Battle of Bethesda Church.

Coates was promoted from 1st lieutenant to captain in 1862 and to Major by brevet in 1864.

On June 13, 1864, Coates was mustered out with the company.

Career

Coates was a member of the Delaware County bar.  He served as Postmaster of the Chester Post Office from 1865 to 1869 and as mayor of Chester from 1887 to 1893. He was succeeded as mayor by John B. Hinkson.

He died on September 21, 1921 and was interred at Chester Rural Cemetery.

See also
List of mayors of Chester, Pennsylvania

References

1921 deaths
19th-century American politicians
Burials at Chester Rural Cemetery
Mayors of Chester, Pennsylvania
Pennsylvania lawyers
Pennsylvania postmasters
Pennsylvania Reserves
People of Pennsylvania in the American Civil War
Union Army officers
Year of birth missing